Kurung-kurung is a traditional Banjar musical instrument originating from South Kalimantan, Indonesia. Kurung-kurung instrument is made of long wood and the bottom is made of bamboo. This musical instrument can make a sound after being pounded to the ground and the rhythm of the music released will be different from each other, to make a different rhythm, the music player will pound the instrument alternately according to the desired rhythm.

Initially, this instrument was played by Meratus Dayak cultivators when planting rice together. The tool used is a stick of bamboo. At the end of the bamboo is shaped in such a way as to resemble an angklung musical instrument, at the other end there is a wooden peg, while rattan is used as a binder.

The end of the bamboo stick with wooden pegs serves to make holes in the ground to insert rice seeds during farming activities. When a stick of bamboo is pounded into the ground to make a hole, a tone is created. When done alternately by several people will create a beautiful rhythm. When the cultivators planted rice together, the men stomped (kurung kurung) to a happy rhythm, making holes in the ground while creating beautiful music. Meanwhile, the women sow the seeds in the holes where the brackets were hit.

Today, Kurung-kurung are no longer a tool for farming. However, this instrument is still played during traditional ceremonies. In addition, Kurung-kurung are also objects of art displayed. This musical instrument is played by art groups in the Kurung Kurung Hantak performance.

See also

 Angklung
 Kolintang
 Music of Indonesia

References

Idiophones
Indonesian musical instruments
Indonesian culture
Category:Indonesian words and phrases]]
Indonesian inventions
Asian percussion instruments